21900 Orus  is a Jupiter trojan asteroid from the Greek camp, approximately  in diameter, and a target of the Lucy mission to be visited in November 2028. It is among the 100 largest Jupiter trojans and has a rotation period of 13.5 hours. It was discovered on 9 November 1999, by Japanese amateur astronomer Takao Kobayashi at his private Ōizumi Observatory in Gunma Prefecture, Japan, and later named Orus after a slain Achaean warrior from the Iliad.

Orbit and classification 

Orus is a dark Jupiter trojan asteroid orbiting in the leading Greek camp at Jupiter's  Lagrangian point, 60° ahead of its orbit in a 1:1 resonance . It is also a non-family asteroid in the Jovian background population.

It orbits the Sun at a distance of 4.9–5.3 AU once every 11 years and 7 months (4,240 days; semi-major axis of 5.13 AU). Its orbit has an eccentricity of 0.04 and an inclination of 8° with respect to the ecliptic. The body's observation arc begins with a precovery, published by the Digitized Sky Survey and taken at Palomar Observatory in November 1951, or 48 years prior to its official discovery observation.

Lucy mission target 
Orus is planned to be visited by the Lucy spacecraft which was launched in 2021.

Physical characteristics 
Orus is characterized as a D-type and C-type asteroid by the Lucy mission team and by Pan-STARRS photometric survey, respectively. It has a V–I color index of 0.95, seem among most larger D-type Jupiter trojans.

Lightcurve 
The first photometric observations of Orus have been made in October 2009, by astronomer Stefano Mottola in a photometric lightcurve survey of 80 Jupiter trojans, using the 1.2-meter telescope at Calar Alto Observatory. The obtained rotational lightcurve rendered a period of  hours with a brightness variation of 0.18 magnitude.

He finds that Orus is a retrograde rotator. The lightcurve suggests the presence of a large crater in the proximity of its north pole.

Diameter and albedo 
According to the surveys carried out by the Japanese Akari satellite and the NEOWISE mission of NASA's Wide-field Infrared Survey Explorer, the body has an albedo of 0.083 and 0.075, with a diameter of 53.87 and 50.81 kilometers, respectively. The Collaborative Asteroid Lightcurve Link assumes a standard albedo for carbonaceous C-type asteroids of 0.057 and calculates a diameter of 55.67 kilometers with an absolute magnitude of 10.0.

Naming 
This minor planet was named from Greek mythology after Orus, an Achaean warrior in Homer's Iliad. He was killed in the Trojan War by the Trojan prince Hector, after whom the largest Jupiter trojan 624 Hektor is named. The approved naming citation was published by the Minor Planet Center on 22 February 2016.

Possible satellite 

Orus has a candidate satellite, detected while searching through Hubble images taken on 7–8 August 2018. Further observations are needed to determine physical characteristics of the satellite, which can help measure the mass of the primary.

See also 
 Discovery program

References

External links 
 Asteroid Lightcurve Database (LCDB), query form (info )
 Dictionary of Minor Planet Names, Google books
 Discovery Circumstances: Numbered Minor Planets (20001)-(25000) – Minor Planet Center
 Asteroid 21900 Orus at the Small Bodies Data Ferret
 
 

021900
Discoveries by Takao Kobayashi
Named minor planets
021900
19991109